VISN or Visn may refer to:

 VISN, the NASDAQ ticker symbol for Visionchina Media, Inc.
 Veterans Integrated Service Network, a US veterans regional health-care system
 Vision Interfaith Satellite Network, a religious television network